Storm Bull (October 20, 1856 – November 17, 1907) was a Norwegian-born American engineer and educator.

Storm Bull was born in Bergen, Hordaland, Norway. He was a nephew of the violinist Ole Bull. He was educated at the Polytechnic Institute in Zurich, Switzerland, where he graduated with a degree in engineering in 1877. He first arrived in Madison, Wisconsin in 1879, where became a professor in the engineering department of the University of Wisconsin. He was subsequently appointed a professor in mechanical engineering and later professor in steam engineering.

Bull held memberships in the Western Society of Engineers, American Society for Engineering Education and the 
American Society of Mechanical Engineers. He also served as mayor of  Madison, Wisconsin from 1901 to 1902. He was a Unitarian.

Bull died of stomach cancer in Madison in 1907.

References

Other sources
Howe, Charles S. (ed) (1909) ''Papers, Reports, Discussions, etc. of the "Journal of Engineering Education"  (Brooklyn, NY: Pratt Institution. Volume 16. page 407)

External links
Portrait of Professor Storm Bull, University of Wisconsin

1856 births
1907 deaths
Norwegian emigrants to the United States
Mayors of Madison, Wisconsin
American mechanical engineers
University of Wisconsin–Madison faculty
Engineers from Bergen
ETH Zurich alumni